Dashli Borun District is a district (bakhsh) in Gonbad-e Qabus County, Golestan Province, Iran. At the 2006 census, its population was 21,839, in 4,428 families.  The District has one city: Incheh Borun.  The District has two rural districts (dehestan): Atrak Rural District and Kerend Rural District.

References 

Districts of Golestan Province
Gonbad-e Kavus County